Neelly is a surname. Notable people with the surname include:

Brandy Neelly, singer
Robert Neelly Bellah (1927–2013), American sociologist
Lance Neelly, American politician

See also 

 Neeley